Şəhriyar (also, Shahriyar and Shahriar) is a village and municipality in the Sharur District of Nakhchivan, Azerbaijan. It is located 3 km in the west from the district center, on the Sharur plain. Its population is busy with tobacco-growing and animal husbandry. There are secondary school, cultural house, library, mosque and a hospital in the village. It has a population of 2,348.

Etymology
The village was named in Şəhriyar (Shahriyar)in honor of the notable Azerbaijani poet of Məhəmməd Şəhriyar (Mohammad-Hossein Shahriar).

References 

Populated places in Sharur District